The Green Bay Packers are a professional American football team based in Green Bay, Wisconsin. They are currently members of the North Division of the National Football Conference (NFC) in the National Football League (NFL), and are the third-oldest franchise in the NFL.  Founded in 1919 by coach, player, and future Hall of Fame inductee Curly Lambeau and sports and telegraph editor George Whitney Calhoun, the Packers organization has become one of the most successful professional football teams, having won a total of 13 professional American football championships—nine NFL Championships and four Super Bowls—the most in the NFL.  The franchise has recorded 18 NFL divisional titles, eight NFL conference championships, and the most regular season and overall victories of any NFL franchise.  In 1963, the Pro Football Hall of Fame was created to honor the history of professional American football and the individuals who have greatly influenced it.  Since the charter induction class of 1963, 33 individuals who have played or coached for the Packers have been inducted into the Pro Football Hall of Fame.

Of the 33 inductees, 26 made their primary contribution to football with the Packers, while five only contributed a minor portion of their career to the Packers and two were assistant coaches.  Of the original 17 individuals inducted in 1963, four spent the major part of their career with the Green Bay Packers.  This includes the founder Curly Lambeau, the NFL's all-time offensive tackle Cal Hubbard, the 1941 and 1942 Most Valuable Player Don Hutson, and 1931 All-NFL player Johnny (Blood) McNally.  The first two decades of the Hall of Fame's existence saw 17 Packers enshrined, including one inductee who was not a player for the Packers, Vince Lombardi.  Coaching the Packers from 1959 to 1967, Lombardi led the team to five NFL Championships, plus winning the first two Super Bowls against the American Football League, and an overall winning percentage of .754.  The most recent Packer to be inducted was LeRoy Butler in 2022.

The 26 inductees who have spent a significant portion of their career with the Packers also have their names presented on the facade around the inside of the Packers' stadium, Lambeau Field, along with the years they spent in Green Bay.

Inductees

Footnotes
Only includes the seasons with the Green Bay Packers organization.
Walt Kiesling spent only a minor portion of his career with the Packers.
Emlen Tunnell spent only a minor portion of his career with the Packers.
Len Ford spent only a minor portion of his career with the Packers.
Ted Hendricks spent only a minor portion of his career with the Packers.
Jan Stenerud spent only a minor portion of his career with the Packers.

References
General

Specific

 
+Green Bay Packers
Hall of Fame